Fruitdale is a census-designated place and unincorporated community in Washington County, Alabama, United States. Its population was 185 as of the 2010 census. Fruitdale High School serves K-12 students in the area. In December 2022, The town was struck by an EF-3 Tornado.

Demographics

As of the 2010 United States Census, there were 185 people living in the CDP. The racial makeup of the CDP was 70.3% White, 27.6% Black and 0.5% from two or more races. 1.6% were Hispanic or Latino of any race.

References

Census-designated places in Washington County, Alabama
Census-designated places in Alabama